Kathleen Dale née Richards (29 June 1895March 3, 1984) was an English translator, musicologist, composer and pianist.

Biography
Kathleen Richards was born in England and studied privately with York Bowen and Fanny Davies. She became Kathleen Dale by marriage to the pianist, composer and teacher Benjamin Dale in 1921. After studying Swedish at University College London she taught music at the Matthay School from 1925 to 1931. She was involved in broadcast concerts from 1927 to 1931 and became a noted musicologist and composer as Kathleen Richards. Under the name Kathleen Dale, she published two books, including a biography of Johannes Brahms in 1970 and a number of professional articles on music and music history. For the 'Symposium' series (edited by Gerald Abraham) she wrote chapters on the keyboard music of Handel, Schubert, Schumann and Grieg. She was appointed musical executor of Dame Ethel Smyth and produced a study of her works.

Selected works
Armies in the Fire
2 Divertimenti for two violins (1940)
 The Flight, part song (1949)
 Frozen Landscape for piano (1948)
 Greek Myths for piano (1921)
 The Horn, part song (1947)
Music for piano Op. 22
'Sprite'
'Starry Silence'
'Bells'
'Homage'
'Tambura'Pastoral for violin and piano (1920)Six Duets for two violinsVersailles for piano (1920)
 Wayfaring for violin and piano (1939)
 The Window, part song (1947)
 Winter, part song (1948)

Books published
 Nineteenth-century Piano Music. New York, Da Capo Press, 1972 (reprint from 1954)
 Brahms: a concertgoer's companion''. London: Clive Bingley, 1970

References

1895 births
1984 deaths
20th-century classical composers
Women classical composers
English classical composers
British music educators
English classical pianists
English women pianists
English biographers
20th-century classical pianists
20th-century English composers
20th-century English women musicians
Women music educators
20th-century women composers
20th-century women pianists